Ulwembua is a genus of African araneomorph spiders in the family Cyatholipidae, and was first described by C. E. Griswold in 1987.

Species
 it contains seven species:
Ulwembua antsiranana Griswold, 1997 – Madagascar
Ulwembua denticulata Griswold, 1987 – South Africa
Ulwembua nigra Griswold, 2001 – Madagascar
Ulwembua outeniqua Griswold, 1987 – South Africa
Ulwembua pulchra Griswold, 1987 (type) – South Africa
Ulwembua ranomafana Griswold, 1997 – Madagascar
Ulwembua usambara Griswold, 2001 – Tanzania

References

Araneomorphae genera
Cyatholipidae
Spiders of Africa